The Mizo people, are a Tibeto-Burmese ethnic group native to the Indian state of Mizoram and neighbouring regions of Northeast India. The term covers several related ethnic groups or clans inside the Mizo group.

All Mizo people claims their folk legends that Sinlung (alternatively called "Chhinlung" or "Khul") was the cradle of the Mizos. Sinlung can either refer to "enclosed with a rock" in the Mizo languages or to a main ancestor named "Chin-Laung" from whom Mizo, Chin and other clans descended.

The present Indian state of Mizoram (literally "Mizoland") was historically called the Lushai Hills or Lushai District. The Lushai Hills area was defined as an excluded area during the British Raj, and as a district of Assam in independent India.

The Mizo are divided into several clans, including the Ralte, Paite, Lai, Hmar, Lusei, Mara, and Thadou/Kuki. In addition to the state of Mizoram, Mizo people inhabit other states in the immediate vicinity, such as Tripura, Assam, Manipur, and Nagaland. The majority of Mizo outside India live across the border in neighbouring Chin State and Sagaing Region, Burma.

The dispersed distribution of Mizo people can be attributed to two factors: migratory practices due to the slash-and-burn Jhum agriculture by villagers, which in turn led to a rapid expansion of their territory during the 18th and 19th centuries, and the pacification of India under British rule. Khawnglung Run is a Mizo-language film, based on true events of the historical massacre of Khawnglung during 1856–1859.

The Mizo were particularly dissatisfied with the government's inadequate response to the 1959–60 mautâm famine. The Mizo National Famine Front, a body formed for famine relief in 1959, later developed into a new political organisation, the Mizo National Front (MNF) in 1961. A period of protests and armed insurgency followed in the 1960s, with the MNF seeking independence from India. 

In 1971, the government agreed to convert the Mizo Hills into a Union Territory, which came into being as Mizoram in 1972. Following the Mizoram Peace Accord (1986) between the Government and the MNF, Mizoram was declared a full-fledged state of India in 1987.

The Mizo people historically speak the Tibeto-Burman Mizo language. There are multiple varieties corresponding to the various clans, but the official and most widely spoken is Duhlian language, which serves as a lingua franca among the Mizo clans. English is the most widely used language for non-Mizo speakers in Mizoram. The state has one of the highest literacy rates in India, at more than 90%.

Etymology
The term Mizo is derived from two Mizo words: Mi and Zo. Mi in Mizo means "person" or "people". The term Zo has two meanings. According to one view, Zo means 'highland' or perhaps 'remote' (cf. van Schendel's term Zomia). Another meaning is "cool" or "crisp" (i.e., a sense/feeling of cool and refreshing air/environment of higher altitude. "Zo" is never used to denote all cool/cold temperatures; the term for such temperature is "vawt"). Zo, in its contemporary sense as well as its usage in terms like Mizo, is cultural and denotes an ethnolinguistic group and identity. Hence, while Mizo may be translated as "highlanders" or "people living in high hills" or "remote areas," the term specifically denotes a person with Zo ethnic membership; that is, Mizo literally means "A Zo person". 

Mizo is a broad ethnic classification of subgroups inhabiting the regions known as Mizoram (in colonial times the Lushai Hills) in India, the Chin Hills in Myanmar and the Chittagong Hills in Bangladesh. Mizo most often refers to those residing in Mizoram. Members of many subgroups of the Zo family have joined and adopted the Mizo category while others have not.

Though the term Mizo is often used to name an overall ethnicity, it is also an umbrella term to denote the various clans, such as the Hmar, Ralte, Lusei, Mara, Paite, Bawm, Pang, Thadou, Vaiphei, Gangte, and Biate. A number of dialects are still spoken under the umbrella of these mentioned clans; some of them are Mizo ṭawng (which is an official language of Mizoram), the Hmar languages, the Paite languages, the Lai languages, Ralte language, and Paang language.

Demography
Sandwiched between Myanmar to the east and south and Bangladesh to the west, the Indian State of Mizoram and its surrounding areas are inhabited by the Mizo people. They are found in the Indian states of Mizoram, Manipur, Tripura and the neighboring Bangladesh and Myanmar. According to Rev Liangkhaia, the clergyman and Mizo historian, in his book Mizo Chanchin – the first-ever published historical account of the Mizo – the Mizo people migrated from China in around 750 AD and stayed in western Myanmar. They then slowly began migrating towards the present-day Mizoram during the fourth decade of the 16th century. Most of the Mizos and their clans had completely migrated to their present location by the third decade of the 18th century.

Mizo people were influenced by British missionaries in the 19th century, as the British Raj subjugated the chieftainship under its dominance, which they later abolished by an Act called the Assam-Lushai District (Acquisition of Chief's Rights) Act in 1954. The spread of education by Christian missionaries led to a high literacy rate of 91.58% by 2011. Almost all the Mizos also adopted Christianity, and most continue to be so to the present day.

Religion

Lushai Animism

Pre-colonialist Mizos were animists, i.e they followed Lushai animism in which the Lushai tribes believed in nature-based spirits and other natural living objects.

Christianity
Once the British colonized the area, British Missionaries converted most of the population to Christianity from their practice of animism, i.e. worshipping nature (e.g., the sun, the moon, rivers, mountains and spirits). Khuma and Khara were the first to be converted to Christianity among the Mizos. As of today, more than 98% of Mizos describe themselves as Christians.

The major Christian denominations in the area are Presbyterian (majority, influenced by the affiliations of the early missionaries), Baptist, Wesleyan Methodist, United Pentecostal Church International, The Salvation Army, Seventh-day Adventist, and Roman Catholic. The Chin Baptist Church is in the Champhai area in the eastern part of the state.

Bnei Menashe

In the 19th century, European Christian missionary activity in the region led to conversion of some Chin, Kuki, and Mizo peoples. In the mid-to-late 20th century, a rather small number of Mizo and related ethnic peoples in Assam and Mizoram began practicing Judaism, after a community leader had a dream in 1951 that they were descendants of the biblical figure Manasseh, a lost tribe of Israel. They number, at most, several thousand in a population of more than 3.7 million in these states. Genetic studies have shown very low affinity with Middle Eastern peoples (including ethnic Jews), and rabbinic authorities in Israel have acknowledged Bnei Menashe people as Jews subsequent to their conversion to Judaism under normative Jewish practices. Several hundred have already emigrated to Israel, where they must undergo complete conversion to be accepted as Jews.

Historical perspective
During the later part of British rule, the people in Lushai Hills as well as in Manipur hills held that the British administration was trying to exert control through the chiefs of the communities. There were several rebellions against the British rule as a result, and an anti-chief movement gained ground. 

In 1946, the Mizo Common Peoples' Union (MCPU) was formed. Upon India becoming independent, the Mizo Union, as it was soon called, demanded that Mizoram should be with India rather than adjoined to Myanmar, as the pro-chief party advocated.

With the independence of India, a secessionist group in the Union favored joining with Myanmar, to which they were linked historically, ethnically and linguistically, with common roots to their languages. The separation of India from Myanmar in the year 1937, the partition of India in 1947, and the government's administrative extension over the Indian part of the area reduced the free mobility of the inhabitants. The rules to allow free passage across the India-Myanmar and India-East Pakistan (now India-Bangladesh) international borders were not regularly honored. Chafing at the restrictions, many of the Mizo never accepted the new territorial boundaries; they rebelled in the March 1966 Mizo National Front uprising.

Sociolinguistic variance
The multi-ethnic and pluralistic state of Mizoram has numerous communities, such as the Mizo (majority) {which includes the Lusei, Ralte, Lawitlang, Renthlei, Pawi-Lusei (Fanai), Khiangte, Renthlei, Faihriam, Hauhulh, Pang, Bawm (Sunthla and Panghawi), Tlanglau, etc.}

Pawi-Lusei 
The Pawi-Lusei people are the descendants of Thatinkuala and his fellowmen, who came from Daidin village near Gangaw. They have a hairstyle like the Muan tribes (people living in Mindat Township, Chin State) in the front side, including the Lusei hair style at the back side. However, they lost their language and assimilated with other peoples of their surroundings. Their clan names are Bawitlung, Hlawndo, Hniarthul, Hniarcheng, Chenhrang, Fanai, Nihliap, Airawn, Ruahngai, Zakham, Suakling, and Tluangzachhawn. The Fanai have eight sub-clans: Chhuanchhir, Rilian, Khintin, Pakhup, Torel, Zarep, Thaai, and Hrangtling. Pakhup have three branches: Thathrang, Ralzatlung and Khawtinnawl. Khawtinnawl have three cadet branches: Aithangvung, Khualsawi, Khawtindal. Aithangvung have four family branches: Zadun, Lianchem, Zakap, and Pazik. Khualsawi have three family branches: Nochhum, Pahnun, and Lalthawm. Khawtindal have seven family branches: Lalchhum, Hleibawr, Dophung, Aiburh, Aitlawh, Sawithang, and Rothang.

Tlau 
This tribe came to be known after establishing their first village at Tlauhmun, Chin State, but due to a quarrel between their Chief and the Zahau Laizo chiefs, they migrated to a place called Bual/Bualhmun, Chin State. At this site, the various subtribes or clans formed. They are Bualchhuak, Bawlchhim, Vantawl, Thlengngam, Chawntung, Khukhau/Khukhan, and Vanling. The first four migrated to Mizoram, while the last three stayed back.

Hualhnam 
This tribe is also known as Vualnam/Gualnam. Main clans include Muansuan, Lamtun, Mitsum, Zuisang, Hangman, Melheu, Helbik, and Matsuan.

Khiangte 
The Khiangtes are the descendants of Pu Thuantak. They have two brothers, Sizang/Siyin and Thaute. It is believed that they came to the present Mizo Hills along with the successive migrations of the Luseis between 1600 A.D. to 1700 A.D. Khiangte is composed of Khupthlang, Khupchhung, Tumchhung, Mualvum, Khello, Chhinghel and Chawngte (Tuichhung, Pamte, Lungte and Muchhipchhuak) clans. They spread throughout Mizoram, Assam, Manipur and Tripura in India; Chittagong hills tracts in Bangladesh, and the Chin State and Sagaing Division.

Paite 

The Paites are indigenous tribes of Mizoram under the Greater Assam state since 1750 AD. The Tribal Research Institute of Mizoram in their published book,"Paite in Mizoram" stated that the Paite people with their Guite chiefs entered the present Mizoram along with Palian Chief of Lushai around the first half of the 18th century. The Union Government has recognised Paite as one of the tribes in Mizoram via The Gazette of India Notice No. 10 of 2003 date 8 January 2003 of the Scheduled Castes and Scheduled Tribes Orders (Amendment) Act, 2002.

The Paites are socially and culturally distinct from other tribes of Mizoram. Major Shakespeare, the first Superintendent of Lushai Hills said that Paite dialect is unintelligible to Lushai. He also recorded that Paite have a distinct culture and customs. They now have a separate semi-autonomous body called the Sialkal Range Development Council in the northern part of Champhai, with headquarters at Mimbung. Most of the Paites in Mizoram belong to the Dapzar Paite or Lamjang tribe.

Lai

In 1953, India adopted a constitution defining itself as a Sovereign Democratic Republic. At that time, the Lai people of the southern part of Mizoram, a segment of the much larger population of Lai/Chin, were granted an Autonomous District Council under the Sixth Schedule of the constitution, to support their identity. Lawngtlai was created as the headquarters of Lai Autonomous District Council.

The people have maintained use of their language in the community and in their education. Maintenance of language as a symbol of identity has been inculcated up to middle school standard. The Lai Autonomous District Council manage their education from primary to middle stage, in which the state government (Mizoram) has no control or interference. Lai people speak both Lai and Mizo languages (the latter is official in the state).

Pang 
The Pang are found largely in the Chamdur valley of Bungtlang South Rural Development Block and some villages in Chawngte, Tlabung and West Phaileng Subdivisions. They have no separate regional self-government or autonomous body of their own.

Together with the Bawm and Tlanglau, they have been struggling to be recognized as a separate tribe. Most of them dwell in Chamdur Valley of India and Chittagong Hills Tracts of Bangladesh.

Hmar 

The Hmar tribe occupy a large area in the northeast of India: Pherzawl District of Manipur, various places across Tripura and Cachar, Hailakandi, Karimganj, and the NC Hills District of Assam. In Mizoram, the Hmar are found in the Aizawl, Kolasib, Champhai and Lunglei districts. A majority of Hmars who live in Mizoram speak the Duhlian language, while few of them who live within Sinlung Hills District Council (SHDC) speak the Khawsak/Darngawn dialect, which is accepted by some as 'the' Hmar language.

In July 1986, after the signing of the Mizo Accord, some Hmar leaders here formed Mizoram Hmar Association, later renamed the Hmar People's Convention (HPC). The HPC spearheaded a political movement for self-governance of the Hmar in Mizoram, demanding an Autonomous District Council (ADC) to cover the Hmar-dominated areas in the north and northwest of Mizoram.

The HPC activists formed an armed wing, the Hmar Volunteer Cell (HVC). The State Government forced them to take up arms until 1992, when representatives of the HPC and the Government of Mizoram mutually agreed to hold ministerial-level talks. After multiple rounds of talks, they signed a Memorandum of Settlement (MoS) in Aizawl on 27 July 1994. Armed cadres of the HPC surrendered along with their weapons in October 1994. The government established the Sinlung Hills Development Council (SHDC) for the Hmar. Some of the HPC leaders and cadres rejected the Memorandum of Settlement, breaking away and forming the Hmar People's Convention – Democratic (HPC-D).

The Hmar tribe comprises numerous sub-tribes or clans (Pahnam in Hmar language) such as Aimol, Biete/Biate, Chiru, Changsan, Chawngthu (Lersia, Khuntil and Vanchiau) Chawhte, Khawzawl, Vankal, Darlong, Darngawn, Faihriem, Hrangchal, Hrangkhawl, ,Hnamte, Hualngo, Khawbung, Lawitlang, Leiri, Lungtau, Neitham, Ngurte, Hekte, Hrangate, Varte, Lungchuang, Sialhnam, Tlawmte, Suamte, Sakachep, Tuahlawr, Chhinghel, Khello, Mualvum, Tumchhung, Khupchhung, Khupthlang, Pakhumate, Selate, Sanate, Pakhuang, Banzang, Tamte, Thiek, Zote, etc. In the past, these tribes had their own villages and their own dialects. However, today the majority of the Hmar population use Hmar language and Mizo language.

The Sinlung Hills Development Council (SHDC) has now been renamed as Sinlung Hills Council as per 2018 agreement.

Renthlei 
Even though the Renthleis may not seem numerous and ancient. In fact, they are a very ancient tribe as compared to the Luseis (descendants of Thlapaa, son of Ngaite). They are a very brave tribe who also settled at Muchhiptlang and Mulen along with Chawngte, Tochhawng and Vanchhawng clans. Their clans include Lianhlun, Zachhing, Tinkulh, Chhing thlang, Chho nghek, Thangthlawl, Sohnel, Thuandum.

Ralte 

The Ralte tribe consisted of 4 main clans, divided into a number of smaller clans. The 4 main clans are Siakeng, Kawlni (Colney), Lelhchhun and Khelte. They are descended from Thahdo, the son of Aisan Pa (Sektak), who was the son of Nuaimangpa Songthu and his wife Neihtong. 1.Siakeng clans - Engkhai, Siakhang, Haizang (Chawnthang & Chawnchhin), Chawngtual, Thangbur, Khumchiang, Hilki, Chhakawm, Engkhung, Khelhau, Darkim, Kipawm, Manglut, Hnawtkhel, Khumtung, Hilthang (Thangsiam, Damphut & Tukhum), Lehvung, Lehvung, Aite, Hauhniang & Hualkheng. 2.Kawlni clans - Arte, Lawisut, Helhlah, Thasûm, Saphaw, Khawnghawr, Bhal eng, Thangkawp, Chuaungeng, Holat, Hlamvel, Zahuat [Chalbawk (Kawlvawm, Chalsawp, Chalchiang, Chaltum, Kawltung, Chalchung) & Doubul {(Renghang-Rengsi, Rengngo), Bungsut & Thangchhuan}]. 3.Lelhchhun clans - Chhunthang, Chhiarkim, Vawngsual, Tunglei, Leihang, Chuanglawk, Thangbung, Hratchhum, Hangdem, Hauphut, Selpeng, Haudim & chungleh. 4.Khelte clans - Vohang, Hausel, Vangtual, Chhinghlu, Hauvawng, Lawnghau, Chiangthir, Tualthang, Chiangkhai, Zaucha, Vohlu, Thatchhing, Chhiarchuang, Zahlei & Keulak.
They also have their own dialect *Ralte.

Chawngthu 
The Chawngthu are said to be the descendants of Lersia Saivate. Two main clans are present in Mizoram: the Khuntil, made up of the Khunsut, Khunthlang, Haukawi, and Saithleng, and the Vanchiau, made up of the Maluang, Chingruam, and Thangchuang.

Hualngo 
Hualngos are recognised as a separate tribe in Myanmar, but in Mizoram they are mostly grouped under the Lusei tribe. Main clans include the Bochung, Chalthleng, Cherput, and Khupno.

Political, linguistic and economic situation
After Indian independence, the democratic change in the administrative set-up of Mizoram led to an anti-chief movement. The feeling was widespread against the autocratic chiefs and for the Mizo Union. In 1955, at a meeting of representatives of various Mizo villages held in Aizawl, the demand arose for a separate hills state. The local people felt they had been ill-served by the Assam Government during the Mautam famine.

When in 1960 the government introduced Assamese as the official language of the state, there were many protests against the Official Language Act of 1961. This was followed by the March 1966 Mizo National Front uprising, resulting in attacks on the military installations in Aizawl, Lunglei and other towns. The Mizo National Front, formerly known as Mizo National Famine Front, declared independence from India.

The Indian government designated Mizoram as a Union Territory on 21 January 1972. Pu Laldenga, the President of Mizo National Front, signed a Peace accord in 1986 with the Government of India, stating Mizoram was an integral part of India. Pu Laldenga came to the ministry in the Interim government which was formed in coalition with Congress in 1987. The Statehood of Mizoram was proclaimed on 20 February 1987.

Present demand for inclusion in the Eighth Schedule
With 91.58% literacy, the 2nd highest in Indian states, Mizoram is a leader in the national emphasis on education. Because of this, its people have demanded that Mizo ṭawng be recognized as an official language in the Eighth Schedule to the Constitution. The demand is important and expressed in various aspects of social and political life.

The English language is widely used in the state, especially in the fields of education, official matters and other formal domains, as it is in other parts of India. English had already penetrated the life of the Mizo people for a long time along with the spread of education.

Christian missionaries in the 19th century developed the current alphabetic system adopted for a written form of the Mizo language. Adoption of the Latin script has facilitated people's learning English as a second language. The admiration and demand for the use of English in Mizoram is no different from the same attitude in other parts of India.

The Mizo have conducted a long, drawn-out socio-political struggle for identity and recognition, and succeeded in gaining political power from the central government in New Delhi. They fear being assimilated with other communities, and continue to insist on their separate identity and use of traditional languages to help maintain that.

References

External links
 Webindia123.com

Mizo
Ethnic groups in Northeast India
Sino-Tibetan-speaking people
Ethnic groups in South Asia
Ethnic groups in Manipur
 
Headhunting
Languages of Bangladesh
Ethnic groups in Bangladesh
Scheduled Tribes of Manipur